Pieter Claeissens may refer to:

 Pieter Claeissens the Elder (1500–1576), Flemish painter
 Pieter Claeissens the Younger (–1623), Flemish painter